Alex Joseph Graman (born November 17, 1977) is former Major League Baseball pitcher. He bats and throws left-handed.  He retired (as a player) in 2014.

College career
Graman was a three-time letterman for coach Bob Warn at Indiana State University from 1997 to 1999. He finished his career as a second team All-MVC in 1998. Graman ranks fourth in Indiana State history with five games of 10+ strikeouts in a career and is seventh on the school's single season strikeout list with 112. He was drafted in the third round by the New York Yankees.

Minor league career
Graman spent 6 seasons in the New York Yankees system; 1999 with the Staten Island Yankees, where he went 6-3 and was named the Top Prospect in the New York–Penn League.  In 2000, he was with the Tampa Yankees of the Florida State League, compiled a record of 8-9 and was promoted to Double A with the Norwich Navigators of the Eastern League. he spent 2001 and part of 2002 with the Navigators as he went 17-11 and earned another promotion to Triple A with the Columbus Clippers of the International League in 2002.  He spent the next four seasons (2002–2005) in Columbus, going 31-31, and New York.  In 2004, he led the International League in strikeouts (129) and was selected as an All-Star for the Clippers.  He finished the 2005 season with the Louisville Bats, the top farm club of the Cincinnati Reds, where he compiled a record of 2-1.

Major League career
In his first start against the Chicago White Sox, he gave up 5 runs in 2 innings pitched. In his next start against the Tampa Bay Devil Rays, he only lasted a third of an inning, giving up five earned runs, but avoided a loss in both appearances. He was outrighted to the Yankee Triple-A club in Columbus after the game with the Tampa Bay squad. He finished the year with a 19.80 ERA.

In , he fared only slightly better, giving up 2 earned runs in one and a third innings before being designated for assignment by the Yankees and later released. On August 10, 2005, Graman signed with the Cincinnati Reds. He pitched in 5 games for their Triple-A affiliate, the Louisville Bats, but despite having a 3.09 ERA, he was released on September 12, 2005.
 
In 5 Major League games, all with the Yankees, he has pitched in 6 innings and given up 17 hits and 13 runs all earned for an ERA of 18.47.

Japan
On January 15, 2006, Graman signed a one-year, 50 million yen (about US$467,000) contract with the Seibu Lions. Graman re-signed with the Lions after the season.

Graman came into his own as a closer, finishing  with a 3-3 record, 31 saves, and a 1.42 ERA. He helped the Lions win the Pacific League championship and the Climax Series before saving Games 1 and 7 of the Japan Series as Seibu beat the Yomiuri Giants 4 games to 3. Graman tossed the final two innings of Game 7, allowing no hits or walks while striking out two. He finished the postseason by allowing two earned runs in five innings, but did not allow a run in three Japan Series frames.

Opening day 2009 found Alex with the defending champions, the Saitama Seibu Lions for his fourth season in the Japanese Pacific League.

Graman's development as a pitcher while in Japan, led many in baseball to believe he would return to the Major Leagues as a set-up man or long reliever.

Korea
On January 16, 2012, Graman signed a contract with a bonus of $50,000 with Kia Tigers of the Korea Baseball Organization. However, he failed the medical test and the pitching workout. Tigers decided not to sign Graman on February 5, 2012.

Coaching Career
Following his retirement, Graman began a career in youth baseball; spending 4 years with the Indiana Bulls travel team and a similar tenure with Zionsville High School.  He is also an instructor at a sports development academy near Indianapolis.

References

External links

1977 births
Living people
Major League Baseball pitchers
Baseball players from Indiana
New York Yankees players
Indiana State Sycamores baseball players
American expatriate baseball players in Japan
Nippon Professional Baseball pitchers
Seibu Lions players
Saitama Seibu Lions players
Staten Island Yankees players
Tampa Yankees players
Norwich Navigators players
Columbus Clippers players
Louisville Bats players
People from Huntingburg, Indiana
People from Dubois County, Indiana